Otto Hunziker (6 May 1879, Aarau – 7 February 1940) was a Swiss politician and writer. Hunziker was the President of Canton Aargau and member of the National Council

References

1879 births
1940 deaths
People from Aarau
Swiss Calvinist and Reformed Christians
Free Democratic Party of Switzerland politicians
Members of the National Council (Switzerland)